The 2012 Thorpe Cup was held at the Georg-Gaßmann-Stadion in Marburg on 21–22 July 2012.

Kai Kazmirek won the men's decathlon event with a personal best score of 8130 points and Kira Biesenbach won the women's heptathlon event, also recording a personal best, with 5878 points.

A number of Olympic athletes were in Marburg over the weekend to practise for the upcoming Summer Games in London. One month after recording his world record, Ashton Eaton competed in five of the ten disciplines, and even secured personal bests in the shot put and javelin throw.



Results

Men's decathlon

Women's heptathlon

References

External links 

 2012 Thorpe Cup results 

2012 in athletics (track and field)
2012 in German sport